The Timber Trail is a 1948 American Western film directed by Philip Ford, written by Robert Creighton Williams, and starring Monte Hale, Lynne Roberts, James Burke, Roy Barcroft, Francis Ford, and Robert Emmett Keane. It was released on June 15, 1948, by Republic Pictures.

Plot
Bart plans to frame Jed for a double-murder and then kill him.

Cast
 Monte Hale as Monte Hale
 Lynne Roberts as Alice Baker
 James Burke as Jed Baker
 Roy Barcroft as Big Bart
 Francis Ford as Ralph Baker
 Robert Emmett Keane as Jordon Weatherbee
 Steve Darrell as Sheriff
 Fred Graham as Henchman Frank
 Wade Crosby as Henchman Walt
 Eddie Acuff as Telegraph Operator
 Foy Willing as Guitar Player Foy
 Riders of the Purple Sage as Stageline Workers

References

External links 
 

1948 films
American Western (genre) films
1948 Western (genre) films
Republic Pictures films
Films directed by Philip Ford
Trucolor films
1940s English-language films
1940s American films